Dows Creek is a rural locality in the Mackay Region, Queensland, Australia.

Geography
Langdon is a neighbourhood within the locality.

History 
Langdon's Creek State School opened in 1921 and closed in 1930.

Dow's Creek Provisional School opened on 17 April 1895. On 1 January 1909, it became Dows Creek State School. It was mothballed on 31 December 2009 and closed on 31 December 2010. It was at 1081 Mount Ossa Road. The school's website was archived.

Education 
There are no schools in Dows Creek. The nearest government primary schools are Gargett State School in neighbouring Gargett to the south and Mirani State School in Mirani to the south-east. The nearest government secondary school is Mirani State High School, also in Mirani.

Amenities 
Dows Creek Community Hall is at 16 Bourkes Road.

References

Further reading 

 

Mackay Region
Localities in Queensland